The Second Battalion, Parachute Regiment (2 PARA), is a formation of the Parachute Regiment, part of the British Army, and subordinate unit within 16th Air Assault Brigade.

2 PARA is an airborne light infantry battalion capable of a wide range of operational tasks, based at Merville Barracks, Colchester Garrison, England. Personnel regularly deploy outside the United Kingdom on operations and training.

History

The 2nd Battalion was formed on 30 September 1941, as the 2nd Parachute Battalion, and later became part of the Army Air Corps. The battalion took part in its first active operation over the night of 27–28 February 1942, Operation Biting, the raid on Bruneval in France.  In honour of the operation, C Company of the battalion took the nickname 'C (Bruneval) Company'. On 1 August of the same year, the battalion was renamed the 2nd Battalion, the Parachute Regiment.

The battalion was part of the 1st Parachute Brigade, 1st Airborne Division, and fought in the British airborne operations in North Africa, Operation Fustian in Sicily, Operation Slapstick on the Italian mainland and, most famously, the Battle of Arnhem in September 1944.

After the Second World War, the battalion was reformed and served with the 6th Airborne Division in Palestine. It was then amalgamated with the 3rd Parachute Battalion and renamed the 2nd/3rd Battalion and shortly afterwards disbanded. A new 2nd Battalion was formed later the same year by renumbering the 5th (Scottish) Parachute Battalion.

In 1951, the battalion was deployed to Ismaïlia, Egypt, after civil unrest in the region, to protect the Suez Canal. In July 1956, 2 Para went to Cyprus to counter the EOKA insurgency. It then took part in Operation Musketeer in November of the same year as part of 16 Independent Parachute Brigade, landing by sea and occupying El Cap.

In June 1961, as part of an 8,000 strong battle-group, 2 Para was sent to Kuwait to forestall a threatened invasion by Iraq. In early 1965 the battalion was rushed to Singapore in response to a threat of invasion of Borneo by Indonesia. In the following Indonesian Confrontation, B Company repulsed an attack by an Indonesian battalion in the Battle of Plaman Mapu. In March 1969, 2 Para went to the Caribbean island of Anguilla to restore the British administration. The men, who were landed by boat from three Royal Navy frigates (along with 40 police officers) were later awarded the Wilkinson Sword of Peace "for acts of humanity and kindness overseas".

In the 1970s, the battalion was sent to Northern Ireland as part of Operation Banner for the first of many tours.

In 1982, the battalion was part of the force sent to the South Atlantic in Operation Corporate, as part of 3 Commando Brigade during the Falklands War.
The battalion's men were the first troops from the main assault body to land on the Falkland Islands. The landing was on the shore at San Carlos Water (codename: Blue Beach). The battalion's first battle was the Battle of Goose Green on 28 May. This was followed by the Battle of Wireless Ridge and then the recapture of Port Stanley.

In August 2001, the battalion was part of the NATO Operation Essential Harvest in Macedonia. This was followed in 2002 by Operation Fingal, in Afghanistan. The battalion also took part in UK operations in Iraq and Afghanistan.

Following the Manchester Arena bombing and the enactment of Operation Temperer, 2 PARA were deployed in London to guard key locations, including the Palace of Westminster.

In August 2021, due to the rapid Taliban advancement through the country of Afghanistan, 2 PARA were deployed on Operation Pitting to aid in the extraction of British nationals from the country.

See also
 Red Devils (Parachute Regiment)
 List of battalions of the Parachute Regiment
 Parachute Regiment and Airborne Forces Museum
List of Second World War British airborne battalions

References

Citations

Bibliography

External links

 2 PARA - British Army official website
 

British Parachute Regiment Battalions
Military units and formations of the Gulf War
Military units and formations of the United Kingdom in the Falklands War
Airborne units and formations of the United Kingdom
Military units and formations of the United Kingdom in the War in Afghanistan (2001–2021)
Military units and formations established in 1941
Military units and formations disestablished in 1947
Military units and formations established in 1948